Niederwil may refer to:

in Switzerland:
 Niederwil, Aargau
 Niederwil, Solothurn
 Niederwil, Zug, part of Cham